Bellowhead is an English contemporary folk band, active from 2004 to 2016, reforming in 2020. The eleven-piece act played traditional dance tunes, folk songs and shanties, with arrangements drawing inspiration from a wide range of musical styles and influences. The band included percussion and a four-piece brass section. Bellowhead's bandmembers played more than 20 instruments among them, whilst all performers provided vocals.

Their third album, Hedonism (2010), is the highest selling independently released folk album of all time, having sold over 60,000 copies and earning the band a silver disk.

The band parted after their final gig at Oxford Town Hall in May 2016. In 2020, the band reformed for a reunion concert and, as of 2022, are undertaking a reunion tour, visiting Portsmouth, Oxford, Leicester, Cambridge, London, Brighton, Southend-on-Sea, Ipswich, Bath, Plymouth, Cardiff, Birmingham, Newcastle-upon-Tyne, Nottingham, Harrogate, Liverpool, Sheffield and Manchester.

History

Early years and Burlesque: 2004–2007
The idea for the band came to Spiers and Boden while the duo were in a traffic jam on tour. The longer they sat in traffic, the more friends they thought to invite to join. This led to the formation of a ten-piece band, with Benji Kirkpatrick, Rachael McShane, Paul Sartin, Pete Flood, Brendan Kelly, Justin Thurgur, Andy Mellon and Giles Lewin completing the initial line-up.

Before they had time to rehearse, the fledgling band were invited to play the first Oxford Folk Festival in April 2004, earning critical approval.

In 2004, the band independently released a five-track EP, publicised as "English World Music", called E.P.Onymous, which generated positive reviews.

In 2006 Gideon Juckes joined the band, primarily playing the tuba, and they released their first full-length album, Burlesque, featuring material from the Napoleonic Wars, the American minstrel movement and sea-shanties from Brazil.

Towards the end of 2007 they became Artists in Residence at the Southbank Centre, making their inaugural appearance with a Christmas Revels event.

Matachin: 2008–2009
In 2008 Bellowhead released their second album Matachin, and a live performance at the Proms followed, which was broadcast live on BBC Four and BBC Radio 3. Sam Sweeney joined the band on fiddles and bagpipes following the departure of Giles Lewin. The following year in August the band were approached about recording music for a 20th anniversary episode of The Simpsons.

Hedonism: 2010–2011
In 2010, Ed Neuhauser replaced Gideon Juckes on helicon and sousaphone.

In October 2010, Bellowhead released their third studio album, Hedonism, which had been recorded in Abbey Road Studios. The album was produced by John Leckie. In honour of the new album, the band developed a new ale also named "Hedonism", with several band members being involved in the brewing process.

Broadcast from April 2011, The Archers spin-off Ambridge Extra featured a revised version of Archers theme tune "Barwick Green", arranged and performed by Bellowhead.

In May 2011, at the 02 Academy in Bournemouth, the band recorded a DVD, Hedonism Live, which was released in late November.

Broadside: 2012–2013
The band recorded a new album, Broadside, in March 2012 at Rockfield Studios with John Leckie which was released mid-October 2012. The album generated generally positive reviews and went straight to number 16 in the UK official album charts and number 1 in the UK independent album charts.

In early 2012 the band undertook a European tour and in November 2012 toured the UK. In early 2013 the band toured the UK, the Netherlands and Belgium.

In October 2013 they recorded a jingle for the flagship BBC Radio 2 folk music show The Folk Show with Mark Radcliffe.

During 2013 they recorded a double A-sided single, Christmas Bells / Jingle Bells which was released on 1 December in digital-only format.

Tenth anniversary, Revival and separation: 2014–2016
In 2014 the band celebrated ten years performing together with two 'Bel10whead' performances in April: Bridgewater Hall and the Royal Albert Hall. A new studio album, Revival, followed, released on 30 June 2014 by Island Records.

Bellowhead headlined the concert in July 2015 to celebrate the opening of the refurbished Cardigan Castle.

The band announced their intention to go their separate ways following a decision by Jon Boden to step down as frontman. Bellowhead played their final gig at Oxford Town Hall, also the venue for their first concert twelve years earlier, on 1 May 2016.

The band announced a one-off reunion concert to be streamed on the 5th December 2020, to celebrate the 10th anniversary of Hedonism. They then followed this up with a nationwide tour in November 2022. Prior to the tour beginning, Paul Sartin died suddenly of a heart attack on 14 September 2022 at the age of 51.  However, the tour was continued despite his death, and in some shows they sang specifically in memory of Sartin. One audience member who went to the Cambridge show in the Corn Exchange remembers that 'They had a song with Paul Sartin's voice, and the rest of the band played behind it. It was a really tear-jerking moment. I remember being so impressed at the band, for going on with the tour after a friend had died.'

Band members

Jon Boden – lead vocals, fiddle, tambourine, shaky egg, thunder tube, kazoo, tin whistle
John Spiers – melodeons, Anglo concertina, Claviola, kazoo, vocals, tambourine
Benji Kirkpatrick – guitar, bouzouki, mandolin, tenor banjo, vocals, kazoo
Rachael McShane – cello, fiddle, kazoo, vocals
Paul Sartin (2004-2022) – fiddle, oboe, slide whistle, kazoo, vocals
Giles Lewin (2004–2008) – fiddle, bagpipes
Sam Sweeney – fiddle, English bagpipes, kazoo, vocals, whistle
Pete Flood – percussion (including frying pan, glockenspiel, knives and forks, clockwork toys, megaphone scratching, stomp box, coal scuttle, party blowers, broomsticks, ratchet, Casio VL-tone, shakers and tambourine), vocals
Gideon Juckes (2006–2010) – sousaphone, helicon, tuba
Ed Neuhauser (2010–2016) – sousaphone, helicon, tuba, vocals
Brendan Kelly – saxophone, bass clarinet, vocals
Justin Thurgur – trombone, vocals
Andy Mellon – trumpet, vocals

Discography

Studio albums

Live albums
Bellowhead Live: The Farewell Tour (2016)
Reassembled (2021)

Singles
"New York Girls" (2010)
"Cold Blows the Wind" (2010)
"10,000 Miles Away" (September, 2012)
"Roll the Woodpile Down" (February, 2013)
"Betsy Baker" (July, 2013)
"Christmas Bells / Jingle Bells" (December, 2013)
"Gosport Nancy" (16 June 2014)
"Let Her Run / I Want to See the Bright Lights Tonight" (22 September 2014)
"Roll Alabama" (20 April 2015)

Extended plays
E.P.Onymous (2004)

DVDs
Live at Shepherds Bush Empire (2009)
Hedonism Live (November, 2011)
Bellowhead Live: The Farewell Tour (2016)

Other works
Umbrellowhead (2009)
Pandemonium – The Essential Bellowhead (2015)

Awards and nominations

At BBC Radio 2 Folk Awards
The BBC Radio 2 Folk Awards are an annual awards ceremony held to celebrate achievement among folk artists that year. During their 12 years together, Bellowhead won eight of these awards, including Best Live Act on five occasions.

|-
| rowspan="1" style="text-align:center;"|2014
| rowspan="1"| Bellowhead
| Best Group
|
|-
| rowspan="2" style="text-align:center;"|2013
| rowspan="1"| Bellowhead
| Best Group
|
|-
| rowspan="1"| Broadside
|Best Album
|
|-
| rowspan="2" style="text-align:center;"|2012
| rowspan="2"| Bellowhead
|Best Group
|
|-
|Best Live Act
|
|-
| rowspan="5" style="text-align:center;"|2011
|-
|rowspan="2"| Bellowhead
|Best Group
|
|-
|Best Live Act
|
|-
|Hedonism
| Best Album
|
|-
|New York Girls
|Best Traditional Track
|
|-
|rowspan="2" style="text-align:center;"| 2010 
|rowspan="2" | Bellowhead
| Best Group
| 
|-
|Best Live Act
|
|-
| rowspan="4" style="text-align:center;"|2009
|-
|rowspan="2"| Bellowhead
| Best Group
| 
|-
|Best Live Act
|
|-
| Fakenham Fair
|Best Traditional Track
|
|-
|rowspan="2" style="text-align:center;"| 2008
|rowspan="2"| Bellowhead
| Best Group
| 
|-
|Best Live Act
|
|-
|rowspan="2" style="text-align:center;"| 2007
|rowspan="2" | Bellowhead
| Best Group
| 
|-
|Best Live Act
|
|-
|rowspan="2" style="text-align:center;"| 2006
|rowspan="2" | Bellowhead
| Best Group
| 
|-
|Best Live Act
|
|-
|rowspan="2" style="text-align:center;"| 2005
|rowspan="2" | Bellowhead
| Best Group
| 
|-
|Best Live Act
|
|}

References

External links
Bellowhead website
Bellowhead forum
Bellowhead Interview - Folk Radio UK

Video clips
 Official YouTube Channel

English folk musical groups
Musical groups established in 2004
Musical groups disestablished in 2016
2004 establishments in England
2016 disestablishments in England
Westpark Music artists